Félix Jean Marie Louis Ancey (2 August 1835, in Marseille – 1 June 1919, in Le Beausset) was a French entomologist and malacologist.

Félix Ancey who lived in Algeria worked mainly on Coleoptera and Hymenoptera. His son César Marie Félix Ancey was also an entomologist and malacologist.

Works
Partial list
 Description d'une nouvelle espèce du genre Ceratorhina. Naturaliste 2: 317 (1880)
 Descriptions de Coléoptères nouveaux. Naturaliste 2: 509 (1881)
 Contributions à la faune de l'Afrique orientale. Descriptions de Coléoptères nouveaux. 2e partie. Naturalista siciliano 2(3): 68-72.
 Contributions à la Faune de l'Afrique Orientale. Descriptions de Coléoptères nouveaux. Il Naturalista Siciliano 2:116-120.
 Contributions à la faune de l'Afrique orientale. Descriptions de Coléoptères nouveaux. Naturalista siciliano (1883)
 Contributions à la faune de l'Afrique orientale. Descriptions de Coléoptères nouveaux. Naturalista siciliano (1883)
 Contributions à la faune de l'Afrique orientale. Naturalista siciliano 8: 224.(1886)

References
Anonym 1886: [Ancey, F. J. M. L.]  Rev. biogr. Soc. malac. Fr. 2:27-28 Portrait
Constantin, R. 1992: Memorial des Coléopteristes Français. Bull. liaison Assoc. Col. reg. parisienne, Paris (Suppl. 14)

External links
 DEI biografi  Portrait Collection details

French entomologists
1835 births
1919 deaths
Scientists from Marseille
French malacologists